The Stream Control Transmission Protocol (SCTP) has a simpler basic packet structure than TCP. Each consists of two basic sections:
 The common header, which occupies the first 12 bytes. In the adjacent diagram, this header is highlighted in blue.
 The data chunks, which form the remaining portion of the packet. In the diagram, the first chunk is highlighted in green and the last of N chunks (Chunk N) is highlighted in red. There are several types, including payload data and different control messages.

Common header 
All SCTP packets require the common header section (shown with a blue background).

 Source port  This field identifies the sending port.

 Destination port  This field identifies the receiving port that hosts use to route the packet to the appropriate endpoint/application.

 Verification tag  A 32-bit random value created during initialization to distinguish stale packets from a previous connection.

 Checksum  SCTP's original design catered for Adler-32;  but RFC 3309 changed the protocol to use the CRC32c algorithm.

Chunks 
Each SCTP packet consists, in addition to the common header, of chunks.
Each chunk has a common format, but the contents can vary.
The green bytes in the diagram above signify one chunk.

 Chunk type  An 8-bit value predefined by the IETF to identify the contents of the chunk value field.

 Chunk flags  Eight flag-bits whose definition varies with the chunk type.  The default value is zero.

 Chunk length  A 16-bit unsigned value specifying the total length of the chunk in bytes (excludes any padding) that includes chunk type, flags, length, and value fields.

 Chunk data  General-purpose data field whose definition varies with the chunk type.

If the chunk length does not equate to a multiple of 4 bytes, then the protocol implicitly pads the chunk with trailing zeros.

Additionally, each chunk type may define a set of parameters which it includes inside the chunk value field (and, consequently, their length in the chunk length).

Two types of parameter exist:
 fixed parameters — they must appear and in the order specified,
 variable-length or optional parameters — they appear after the fixed parameters and may appear in any order and in any number.

For optional/variable-length parameters, the parameter type, parameter length, and parameter value fields all behave just like their chunk counterparts.
The minimum size of parameter is 4 bytes, and this occurs when the parameter value field is empty and the parameter consists only of the type and length fields.

List of chunk types
RFC 2960 defines the following list of chunk types. More detailed information about each type is provided in the following subsections.

Following this table each chunk and its parameters are defined. Please note the following color scheme:
 gray: chunk fields,
 red: fixed parameters,
 green/blue: optional/variable-length parameters that alternate colors.

DATA chunk 

 Chunk type  always 0 for payload data (DATA).
 Chunk flags  There are  only 4 flags used
 I — SACK chunk should be sent back without delay.
 U — If set, this indicates that this data is an unordered chunk and the stream sequence number is invalid. If an unordered chunk is fragmented, then each fragment has this flag set.
 B — If set, this marks the beginning fragment. An unfragmented chunk has this flag set.
 E — If set, this marks the end fragment. An unfragmented chunk has this flag set.

 Chunk length  The chunk length has a minimum value of 17 as data of size less than one byte is not allowed.

 Fixed parameters:
 Transmission sequence number (TSN)  The sequence number for the entire DATA stream (used in fragmentation for reassembly).
 Stream identifier  Identifier of the stream that this data chunk belongs to.
 Stream sequence number  Identifier of the sequence number for the message in this stream.  If a message is fragmented then this value is maintained for all fragments.
 Payload protocol identifier  Application-specific protocol identifier. SCTP makes no use of this or modification of it. However, devices along the path or the endpoints may use it. A value of 0 indicates that no payload protocol is specified.
 Data  Application-specific data.

 Optional parameters: none.

INIT chunk

 Chunk type  always 1 for initiation (INIT).
 Chunk flags  There are currently no flags used.
 Chunk length  This is the chunk length which has a minimum value of 20 when chunk value is empty and no optional parameters are used.

 Fixed parameters have identical meaning as INIT ACK:
 Initiate tag  Unsigned 32-bit number that is used in every SCTP packet in the verification tag within the common header.
 Advertised receiver window credit (a_rwnd)  Amount of dedicated buffer space for this association that should never be reduced.
 # of outbound streams  Number of outbound streams (from the sender of the INIT) it wishes to use for this association. Zero is an invalid value, and the receiver should ABORT the association upon receiving a zero.
 # of inbound streams  Identical to # of outbound streams but number of inbound streams. No negotiation takes place on the established number, but the minimum of requested and offered should be used.
 Initial TSN  Initial transmission sequence number to be used and may be any value.

 Optional parameters appear with alternating background colors of green and blue:
 Parameter type = 5  This parameter lists all the IPv4 addresses used at the sending endpoint. If it is a multihomed connection, then the IP address of each may be included.
 Parameter type = 6  This parameter lists all the IPv6 addresses used at the sending endpoint. If it is a multihomed connection, then the IP address of each may be included.
 Parameter type = 9  This parameter provides a suggested life-span increment the receiver should add to its default cookie life-span (in milliseconds).
 Parameter type = 11  This parameter is a hostname as defined in RFC 1123, section 2.1. Actual resolution of this name is outside the scope of SCTP. Additionally, a null terminating character must be included and must be included in the parameter length.
 Parameter type = 12  This parameter lists the address types the sender supports (e.g., IPv4 = 5, IPv6 = 6, hostname = 11).
 Parameter type = 32768  This parameter is reserved for explicit congestion notification support.

INIT ACK chunk
The INIT ACK chunk replicates the INIT chunk except the chunk type is always 2.

 Mandatory parameters, only in INIT ACK:
 Parameter type = 7 (state cookie) The state cookie holds the minimal information to recreate the transmission control block and is signed with the sender's private key. The format of the cookie is not specified.

SACK chunk

 Chunk type  Always 3 for selective acknowledgment (SACK).
 Chunk flags  There are currently no flags used.
 Chunk length  This is the chunk length, which has a minimum value of 16 when no gaps or duplicates are sent.

 Fixed parameters:

 Cumulative TSN ACK  Acknowledges all sequence numbers up to and including this number. Chunks with TSNs above this number have not been received yet – except those included in the optional gap ACK blocks (see below).
 Advertised receiver window credit  Amount of dedicated buffer space for this association that should never be reduced.
 Number of gap ACK blocks  Indicates the number of gap ACK blocks (i.e. pairs of start and end TSNs) included in this chunk.
 Number of duplicate TSNs  Indicates the number of duplicate TSNs reported in this chunk.

 Optional parameters appear with alternating background colors of green and blue:

 Gap ACK block #N start  Indicates a positive offset (with reference to the cumulative TSN ACK value) to the first TSN of an additional block of TSNs that are acknowledged.
 Gap ACK block #N end  Indicates a positive offset (with reference to the cumulative TSN ACK value) to the last TSN of an additional block of TSNs that are acknowledged.
 Duplicate TSN #X  A TSN that was received more than once. A TSN will appear in this list for each time it is received after the first time.

HEARTBEAT chunk

 Chunk type  For heartbeat (HEARTBEAT), this value is always 4.
 Chunk flags  There are currently no flags used.
 Chunk length  This is the chunk length which has a minimum value of 8 with no parameter value added.

 Fixed parameters: None

 Optional parameters are shown with alternating background colors of green and blue:

 Parameter type = 1  This parameter contains the sender-specific heartbeat info

HEARTBEAT ACK chunk 

 Chunk type  For heartbeat acknowledgement (HEARTBEAT ACK), this value is always 5.
 Chunk flags  There are currently no flags used.
 Chunk length  This is the chunk length, which has a minimum value of 8 with no parameter value added.

 Fixed parameters: None

 Optional parameters are shown with alternating background colors of green and blue:

 Parameter type = 1  This parameter contains the sender-specific heartbeat info received in the request.

ABORT chunk

 Chunk type  always 6 for abort (ABORT).
 Chunk flags  There is currently only one flag used:
 T  Set if the sender sent its own verification tag (that receiver should check); not set if the sender sent peer's verification tag (which should be checked anyway).
 Chunk length  This is the chunk length, which has a minimum value of 4 with no error causes given.

 Optional parameters (the error causes) are defined in the ERROR chunk.

SHUTDOWN chunk 

 Chunk type  For shutdown (SHUTDOWN), this value is always 7.
 Chunk flags  There are currently no flags used.
 Chunk length  This is the chunk length, which has a fixed length of 8.

Fixed parameters:

 Cumulative TSN ACK  Contains the last TSN received in sequence by the sender.

SHUTDOWN ACK chunk 

 Chunk type  For shutdown acknowledgement (SHUTDOWN ACK), this value is always 8.
 Chunk flags  There are currently no flags used.
 Chunk length  This is the chunk length, which has a fixed length of 4.

ERROR chunk

 Chunk type  For error (ERROR), this value is always 9.
 Chunk flags  There are currently no flags used.
 Chunk length  This is the chunk length, which has a minimum value of 8 when only one error is sent with no parameter value. The size is 4 bytes plus the size of all error causes.

 Fixed parameters: None.

 Optional parameters are shown with alternating background colors of green and blue:

 Parameter type = 1  This parameter identifies that the sender received an invalid stream-identifier.
 Parameter type = 2  This parameter indicates that the sender received an INIT or INIT ACK chunk with missing mandatory parameters.
 Parameter type = 3  This parameter indicates receipt of a valid state cookie but it was stale by a given number of microseconds.
 Parameter type = 4  This parameter indicates the sender is out of resources; this usually accompanies an ABORT chunk.
 Parameter type = 5  This parameter identifies an address that the sender could not resolve (possibly because it does not support the address type); this usually accompanies an ABORT chunk.
 Parameter type = 6  This parameter identifies an unrecognized chunk when the chunk type's most-significant bits are 01 or 11.
 Parameter type = 7  This parameter identifies a mandatory parameter in an INIT or INIT ACK chunk has an invalid value.
 Parameter type = 8  This parameter is directed to the originator of an INIT ACK chunk that contained an unrecognized parameter.
 Parameter type = 9  This parameter indicates a DATA chunk contained no user data; this usually accompanies an ABORT chunk.
 Parameter type = 10  This parameter indicates the sender received a COOKIE ECHO while the endpoint was in a SHUTDOWN-ACK-SENT state.

COOKIE ECHO chunk 

 Chunk type  always 10 for cookie echo (COOKIE ECHO).
 Chunk flags  There are currently no flags used.
 Chunk length  This is the chunk length.
 Chunk value  Contains the cookie data.

COOKIE ACK chunk

 Chunk type  For cookie acknowledgement (COOKIE ACK), this value is always 11.
 Chunk flags  There are currently no flags used.
 Chunk length  This is the chunk length and is always 4.

ECNE chunk
Not defined yet.

CWR chunk
Not defined yet.

SHUTDOWN COMPLETE chunk

 Chunk type  For shutdown complete (SHUTDOWN COMPLETE), this value is always 14.
 Chunk flags  There is currently only one flag defined
 T  Set if the sender didn't have a TCB; not set if the sender had one (that it destroyed).
 Chunk length  This is the chunk length, which has a fixed length of 4.

AUTH chunk

 Chunk type  For the authentication chunk (AUTH), this value is always 15.
 Chunk flags  There are currently no flags used.
 Chunk length  Length of the HMAC + 8.

 Fixed parameters:
 Shared key identifier  identifies the shared key that was used.
 HMAC identifier  identifies the type of HMAC used.
 HMAC  HMAC value. Might not be a multiple of 4 bytes. The SCTP protocol takes care of padding to a 4-byte boundary.

 Optional parameters: none

ASCONF-ACK chunk 

 Chunk type  always 128 for the address reconfiguration acknowledgement chunk (ASCONF-ACK).
 Chunk flags  There are currently no flags used.
 Chunk length  Depends on the number and length of ASCONF parameter responses included.

 Fixed parameters:
 Sequence number  The sequence number of the ASCONF packet being acknowledged.

 Optional parameters:
 ASCONF parameter response 1..N  Address reconfiguration parameter responses (variable length).

RE-CONFIG chunk

 Chunk type  always 130 for the stream reconfiguration chunk (RE-CONFIG).
 Chunk flags  There are currently no flags used.
 Chunk length  Depends on the number and length of re-configuration parameters.

 Fixed parameters:
 Re-configuration parameter 1  First stream reconfiguration parameter.

 Optional parameters:
 Re-configuration parameter 2  Second stream reconfiguration parameter.

At most two re-configuration parameters from those mentioned below may appear in this chunk. Not all combinations are valid, see RFC 6525 for details.

Outgoing SSN reset request parameter
This parameter is used by a sender to inform the receiver that it wishes to reset the sequence numbers (or message-ids if I-DATA is used) for its outgoing streams.

 Parameter type  always 13 for the outgoing SSN reset request parameter.
 Parameter length  16 + 2N.

 Fixed parameters:
 Re-configuration request sequence number  Sequence number of this re-configuration request.
 Re-configuration response sequence number  Sequence number of the last re-configuration request received.
 Sender's last assigned TSN  Last TSN assigned by the sender (strictly speaking: one less than the next TSN to be assigned).

 Optional parameters:
 Stream number 1..N  Stream numbers for which the SSN or MID must be reset. If none specified, all SSNs/MIDs will be reset.

Incoming SSN reset request parameter
This parameter is used by a sender to request that the receiver resets the sequence numbers (or message-ids if I-DATA is used) for its outgoing streams.

 Parameter type  always 14 for the incoming SSN reset request parameter.
 Parameter length  8 + 2N.

 Fixed parameters:
 Re-configuration request sequence number  Sequence number of this re-configuration request.

 Optional parameters:
 Stream number 1..N  Stream numbers for which the SSN or MID must be reset. If none specified, all SSNs/MIDs will be reset.

SSN/TSN reset request parameter
This parameter is used by a sender to inform the receiver that it wishes to reset all TSNs and all SSNs/MIDs for all streams.

 Parameter type  always 15 for the SSN/TSN reset request parameter
 Parameter length  8

 Fixed parameters: 
 Re-configuration request sequence number  Sequence number of this re-configuration request.

 Optional parameters: none

Re-configuration response parameter
This parameter is used as a response to a re-configuration request, except possibly for an incoming SSN reset request, which elicits an outgoing SSN reset request parameter if granted.

 Parameter type  always 16 for the re-configuration response parameter
 Parameter length  12 or 20

 Fixed parameters: 
 Re-configuration response sequence number  Sequence number of the corresponding re-configuration request.
 Result  Result code

{| class="wikitable"
|-
! Resultcode !! Description !! rowspan="5" style="border: none; background: none;"| !! Resultcode !! Description
|-
| 0 || Success – Nothing to do || 4 || Error – Request already in progress
|-
| 1 || Success – Performed || 5 || Error – Bad sequence number
|-
| 2 || Denied || 6 || In progress
|-
| 3 || Error – Wrong SSN || ||
|}

 Optional parameters: (either both or none must be present)
 Sender's next TSN  Next TSN that the sender of the response will use. Only in response to SSN/TSN reset request.
 Receiver's next TSN  Next TSN that the receiver of the response must use. Only in response to SSN/TSN reset request.

Add outgoing streams request parameter
This parameter is used by a sender to request that additional outgoing streams be added to the association (i.e. incoming streams for the receiver).

 Parameter type  always 17 for the add outgoing streams request parameter
 Parameter length  12

 Fixed parameters: 
 Re-configuration request sequence number  Sequence number of this re-configuration request.
 Number of new streams  Number of outgoing streams (sender to receiver) to add to the association.

 Optional parameters: none

Add incoming streams request parameter
This parameter is used by a sender to request that additional incoming streams be added to the association (i.e. outgoing streams for the receiver).

 Parameter type  always 18 for the add incoming streams request parameter
 Parameter length  12

 Fixed parameters: 
 Re-configuration request sequence number  Sequence number of this re-configuration request.
 Number of new streams  Number of incoming streams (receiver to sender) to add to the association.

 Optional parameters: none

PAD chunk
The PAD chunk was introduced to facilitate path MTU discovery, by enabling a sender to arbitrarily increase the size of an SCTP packet.

 Chunk type  always 132 for the padding chunk (PAD).
 Chunk flags  There are currently no flags used.
 Chunk length  Depends on the size of padding data. The minimum length is 4 bytes.

 Fixed parameters: none

 Optional parameters:
 Padding data  Arbitrary data – will be ignored and unceremoniously discarded by the receiver.

I-DATA chunk 
The I-DATA chunk was introduced to avoid a large message in one stream blocking messages in all other streams from being transmitted: SCTP primarily uses the TSN to achieve reliability. In some cases, the TSN is also needed to distinguish different DATA chunks.

When a message is fragmented, the DATA TSN additionally doubles as a fragment sequence number. This means that all fragments in a message must be sent using consecutive TSNs, effectively blocking all other data. The I-DATA chunk disentangles the different uses of the TSN in DATA chunks.

As DATA and I-DATA  chunks are not compatible, they may not both be used in the same association.

 Chunk type  always 64 for payload data supporting interleaving (I-DATA).
 Chunk flags  There are  only 4 flags used
 I — SACK chunk should be sent back without delay.
 U — If set, this indicates this data is an unordered chunk. If an unordered chunk is fragmented, then each fragment has this flag set.
 B — If set, this marks the beginning fragment. An unfragmented chunk has this flag set.
 E — If set, this marks the end fragment. An unfragmented chunk has this flag set.

 Chunk length  The chunk length has a minimum value of 21, as data of size less than one byte is not allowed.

 Fixed parameters:
 Transmission sequence number (TSN)  The sequence number for the entire DATA stream (used for acknowledgement and retransmission).
 Stream identifier  Identifier of the stream that this data chunk belongs to.
 Message identifier (MID)  Identifier of the message in this stream. If a message is fragmented then the same value is used for all fragments. For ordered messages, the MID also specifies the order in which the messages should be delivered to the upper layer. Ordered and unordered messages in the same stream use independent MID sequences.
 Payload protocol identifier  Application-specific protocol identifier, only present if the B flag is set.  SCTP makes no use of this or modification of it. However, devices along the path or the endpoints may use it. A value of 0 indicates that no payload protocol is specified.
 Fragment sequence number  Fragment number for fragmented packets. Only present if the B flag is not set. If the B flag is set, then the fragment sequence number is implicitly zero, and the payload protocol identifier occupies the same space instead.
 Data  Application-specific data.

 Optional parameters: none.

FORWARD-TSN chunk 
The FORWARD-TSN chunk was introduced to support selective unreliability: it allows the sender to tell the receiver that it will not retransmit some number of chunks, and requests that the receiver consider all these chunks as received.

 Chunk type  always 192 for the forward TSN chunk (FORWARD-TSN).
 Chunk flags  There are currently no flags used.
 Chunk length  Depends on the number of new stream sequence numbers included.

 Fixed parameters:
 New cumulative transmission sequence number (TSN)  The next TSN that the receiver should expect. Any previous TSNs should be considered received.

 Optional parameters:
 Stream identifier 1..N  Stream identifiers of streams that were skipped by this chunk.
 Stream sequence 1..N  New stream sequence numbers associated with the streams that were skipped.

ASCONF chunk 

 Chunk type  always 193 for the address reconfiguration chunk (ASCONF).
 Chunk flags  There are currently no flags used.
 Chunk length  Depends on the type of IP address and the number and lengths of ASCONF parameters included.

 Fixed parameters:
 Sequence number  The sequence number of the ASCONF packet.
 Address parameter  parameter type : Type of address in the address parameter: 5 for IPv4, 6 for IPv6.
 Address parameter  parameter length : Length of the address parameter: 8 for IPv4, 20 for IPv6.
 Address parameter  IP address : 4 bytes for IPv4, 16 bytes for IPv6.

 Optional parameters:
 ASCONF parameter 1..N  Address reconfiguration parameters (variable length).

I-FORWARD-TSN chunk 
The I-FORWARD-TSN chunk was introduced to be used instead of FORWARD-TSN when I-DATA is used instead of DATA.

 Chunk type  always 194 for the forward TSN chunk with support for interleaving (I-FORWARD-TSN).
 Chunk flags  There are currently no flags used.
 Chunk length  Depends on the number of new stream message identifiers included.

 Fixed parameters:
 New cumulative transmission sequence number (TSN)  The next TSN that the receiver should expect. Any previous TSNs should be considered received.

 Optional parameters:
 Stream identifier 1..N  Stream identifiers of streams that were skipped by this chunk.
 U  0 if the new message identifier is associated with the ordered messages, 1 if it is associated with the unordered messages in the stream.
 Message identifier 1..N  New message identifiers associated with the streams that were skipped.

Notes

References
  Stream Schedulers and User Message Interleaving for the Stream Control Transmission Protocol
  SACK-IMMEDIATELY Extension for the Stream Control Transmission Protocol
  Stream Control Transmission Protocol (SCTP) Stream Reconfiguration
  Stream Control Transmission Protocol (SCTP) Dynamic Address Reconfiguration
  Stream Control Transmission Protocol (Obsoletes: 2960, 3309)
  Authenticated Chunks for the Stream Control Transmission Protocol (SCTP)
  Packetization Layer Path MTU Discovery
  Padding Chunk and Parameter for the Stream Control Transmission Protocol (SCTP)
  Stream Control Transmission Protocol (SCTP) Specification Errata and Issues
  Stream Control Transmission Protocol (SCTP) Management Information Base (MIB)
  Stream Control Transmission Protocol (SCTP) Partial Reliability Extension
  On the Use of Stream Control Transmission Protocol (SCTP) with IPsec
  Transport Layer Security over Stream Control Transmission Protocol
  Stream Control Transmission Protocol (SCTP) Checksum Change
  An Introduction to the Stream Control Transmission Protocol
  Stream Control Transmission Protocol Applicability Statement
  Stream Control Transmission Protocol

Internet protocols
Internet Standards
Transport layer protocols